The Calgary City Council is the legislative governing body that represents the citizens of Calgary. The council consists of 15 members: the chief elected official, titled the mayor, and 14 councillors. Jyoti Gondek was elected mayor in October 2021 as the city's 37th. Each of the 14 councillors represent one of the city's 14 wards.

Elections 
The mayor of Calgary is elected through a citywide vote by all eligible voters. The mayor represents the interests of the city as a whole. The councillors are elected by the constituents of each ward. The councillors represent the interests of their respective wards. The mayor and councillors hold the office for 4-year terms. The last municipal election was held on October 18, 2021.

Governing system 

The Calgary city government is the council-manager form of government. The mayor and councillors oversee the City Manager and the administration of the city.

Calgary's City Council is a council-policy committee system. The Council establishes its policies for governing the city based on information provided by four standing policy committees:

 Planning and Urban Development
 Transportation and Transit 
 Utilities and Corporate Services
 Community and Protective Services

These committees meet once every month at City Hall and are composed of councillors and are responsible for approving and recommending policies to City Council. The general public is invited to the committee meeting to make presentations. Any decisions that come out of these meetings need final approval from the Council as a whole.

There are also a number of civic committees, boards, and authorities that help to create policies in specialized areas, such as parking, the preservation of heritage sites and buildings, and planning and development matters. These civic committees, board and authorities consist of citizens and one or more councillor.

City Council meets three Mondays every month in the Council Chambers at the Calgary Municipal Building. Two meetings are regular Council meetings, where issues from the four policy committees are discussed. The third meeting is a public hearing, where planning matters are generally discussed. Citizens do not address Council during the two regular meetings, however the public hearings are designed for the citizens to speak directly with their elected councillor regarding specific issues.

Financing 
The city had an operating budget of $2.1 billion for 2007, supported 41% by property taxes. $757 million in property taxes are collected annually, with $386 million from residential and $371 million from non-residential properties. 54% of the budget is spent for wages of the 13,043 city employees and expenditures. The average Calgary household pays approximately $2,100 per year in city tax.

History

Mayor 
From 1884 to 1923, mayoralty elections were held annually. A plebiscite held in 1923 increased the term in office for the mayor from one to two years. In 1968, the Municipal Act increased the term in office by one year, for a total of three years. In 2013, the term for mayor was amended in the Local Authorities Election Act to 4 years.

City Commissioners
Calgary had city commissioners from early 1900s into the 1950s. The city elected its city commissioners in the 1910s and 1920s. Otherwise they were appointed by the city council. The city of Calgary continues to have six commissioners that are appointed for life. Their names are listed in past City Handbooks but have since been removed from newer editions.

Councillors 
From 1884 to 1886, four councillors were selected from the town. In 1894, Calgary was divided into three wards, increasing the number of councillors to six. Later, three aldermen represented each ward. In 1906, a fourth ward was created, bringing the total number of aldermen to 12. From 1914 to 1960, aldermen were elected from across the city for two-year terms, dismantling the ward system. Staggered elections made half the council up for election each year. Commissioners were also elected in the early years. From 1917 to 1971, councillors were elected using single transferable votes to achieve a degree of proportionality/ fairness. After a plebiscite in 1960 the ward system was re-established in the city. Six wards were established, each represented by two aldermen. In 1974, voters had up to two votes under the block voting system to elect the two councillors in their ward. In 1976, the number of wards expanded to 14 (current number) with one alderman representing each ward for three years (and voters having only one vote). On December 14, 2010, council voted to change the title to councillor, which took effect in the October 2013 election. In 2012 the Local Authorities Election Act was amended to increase the term length to 4 years.

Wards, communities and councillors

See also 
List of mayors of Calgary
List of Calgary municipal elections
List of neighbourhoods in Calgary

References

External links 
 City of Calgary

Municipal councils in Alberta
Politics of Calgary